Gary E. Close (born 1957) is an American basketball coach.

Biography 
A native of Moorestown Township, New Jersey, Close is married with two children (Sam Close & Ellen Close) . Close is a graduate of Arizona State University. He resides in Middleton, Wisconsin.

Career
Close was an assistant coach with the Stanford Cardinal and the Iowa Hawkeyes before taking a head coaching position at Regina High School in Iowa City, Iowa. He joined the Wisconsin Badgers as an assistant coach in 2003. He resigned his position on March 30, 2016 after 13 years with the team. He has been a part of 2 Big Ten Regular Season Championships, 3 Big Ten tournament championships, 22 NCAA Tournaments, and 2 Final Fours.

References

1957 births
Living people
Arizona State University alumni
High school basketball coaches in Iowa
Iowa Hawkeyes men's basketball coaches
People from Moorestown, New Jersey
Stanford Cardinal men's basketball coaches
Wisconsin Badgers men's basketball coaches
People from Middleton, Wisconsin
Educators from New Jersey